Iglesiarrubia is a municipality located in the province of Burgos, Castile and León, Spain. According to the 2014 census (INE), the municipality had a population of 41.

References 

Municipalities in the Province of Burgos